The 2022 Rally Catalunya (also known as the RallyRACC Catalunya - Costa Daurada 2022) was a motor racing event for rally cars that was held over four days between 20 and 23 October 2022. It marked the fifty-seventh running of the Rally de Catalunya. The event was the twelfth round of the 2022 World Rally Championship, World Rally Championship-2 and World Rally Championship-3.

Thierry Neuville and Martijn Wydaeghe were the defending rally winners. Their team, Hyundai Shell Mobis WRT, were the defending manufacturers' winners. Eric Camilli and Maxime Vilmot were the defending winners in the WRC-2 category. Emil Lindholm and Reeta Hämäläinen were the defending winners in the WRC-3 category.

Sébastien Ogier and Benjamin Veillas won their first rally of the season. Their team, Toyota Gazoo Racing WRT, won the 2022 manufacturers' title. Teemu Suninen and Mikko Markkula won the World Rally Championship-2 category. Lauri Joona and Mikael Korhonen won the World Rally Championship-3 category, and with the victory, Joona became the 2022 WRC-3 champion.

Background

Entry list
The following crews entered into the rally. The event was opened to crews competing in the World Rally Championship, its support categories, the World Rally Championship-2 and World Rally Championship-3, and privateer entries that were not registered to score points in any championship, as well as the European Rally championship and its support categories. Twelve entered under Rally1 regulations, as were thirty-three Rally2 crews in the World Rally Championship-2 and four Rally3 crews in the World Rally Championship-3.

Itinerary
All dates and times are CEST (UTC+2).

Report

WRC Rally1

Classification

Special stages

Championship standings
Bold text indicates 2022 World Champions.

WRC-2 Rally2

Classification

Special stages

Championship standings
Bold text indicates 2022 World Champions.

WRC-3 Rally3

Classification

Special stages

Championship standings
Bold text indicates 2022 World Champions.

Notes

References

External links
  
 2022 Rally Catalunya at eWRC-results.com
 2022 Rally Catalunya at rally-maps.com 

2022 in Catalan sport
2022 in Spanish motorsport
2022 World Rally Championship season
October 2022 sports events in Spain
2022